The Complete Adventures of The Style Council is a box set by The Style Council, released in 1998, nine years after their split. It contains most of their material in chronological order, including their previously unreleased final studio album Modernism: A New Decade from 1989 on the fifth disc. It was released after the success of Paul Weller's previous band The Jam's similar 1997 box set Direction Reaction Creation.

Allmusic reviewed the box set, saying "for most listeners, including some serious Weller fans, The Style Council is best appreciated as a singles band, but for the dedicated, The Complete Adventures reveals that the Style Council, no matter how maddening they could be, were a group that continually reinvented themselves, occasionally making some remarkable music along the way."

A box set of the band's six albums in separate discs was released as Classic Album Selection in July 2013.

Track listing

Disc one
"Speak Like a Child" – 3:18
"Party Chambers" – 3:22
"Money-Go-Round (Parts 1 & 2)" – 7:29
"Headstart for Happiness" (early version) – 2:50
"Mick's Up" – 3:13
"Long Hot Summer" (extended 12" version) – 7:03
"The Paris Match" (early version) – 3:46
"Le Départ" – 2:49
"A Solid Bond In Your Heart" – 3:18
"It Just Came to Pieces In My Hands" – 2:32
"My Ever Changing Moods" (12" version) – 5:43
"Mick's Company" – 2:49
"Spring, Summer, Autumn" – 2:24
"Mick's Blessings" – 1:17
"The Whole Point of No Return" – 2:44
"Me Ship Came In!" – 3:08
"Blue Cafe" – 2:18
"The Paris Match" (album version) – 4:27
"My Ever Changing Moods" (album version) – 3:39
"Dropping Bombs on the Whitehouse" – 3:15
"A Gospel" – 4:47

Disc two
"Strength of Your Nature" – 4:21  
"You're the Best Thing" (album version) – 5:42  
"Here's One That Got Away" – 2:37  
"Headstart for Happiness" (album version) – 3:22 
"Council Meetin'" – 2:34  
"The Big Boss Groove" – 4:40
"Shout to the Top!" – 4:16
"Ghosts of Dachau" – 2:51
"The Piccadilly Trail" – 3:45
"Soul Deep"  7:12
"Walls Come Tumbling Down" – 3:25
"The Whole Point II" – 2:51
"Blood Sports" – 3:36
"Spin' Drifting" – 3:11
"Homebreakers" – 5:03
"All Gone Away" – 2:17
"Come to Milton Keynes" – 3:05
"Internationalists" – 3:06
"A Stones Throw Away" – 2:19
"The Stand Up Comic's Instructions" – 1:33
"Boy Who Cried Wolf" – 5:29

Disc three
"A Man of Great Promise" – 2:35 
"Down in the Seine" – 2:44
"The Lodgers (or She Was Only a Shopkeeper's Daughter)" – 3:58
"Luck" – 2:36
"With Everything To Lose" – 3:56
"Our Favourite Shop" – 2:55
"(When You) Call Me" – 3:20
"Have You Ever Had It Blue" – 4:48
"Mr. Cool's Dream" – 2:28
"It Didn't Matter" – 5:45
"All Year Round" – 2:18
"Right To Go" – 5:12
"Heavens Above" – 6:13
"Fairy Tales" – 4:09
"Angel" – 4:32
"Walking the Night" – 4:32
"Waiting" – 4:27
"The Cost of Loving" (Album Version) – 4:20 
"A Woman's Song" – 3:03
"Francoise" – 2:44

Disc four
"Wanted (or Waiter, There's Some Soup In My Flies)" – 3:24
"The Cost of Loving" (12" Slow Vocal Version) – 3:50
"Life at a Top Peoples Health Farm" – 5:48
"Sweet Loving Ways" – 3:32
"It's a Very Deep Sea" – 5:34
"The Story of Someone's Shoe" – 3:41
"Changing of the Guard" – 2:51
"The Little Boy in a Castle / A Dove Flew Down from the Elephant" – 3:02
"The Gardener Of Eden (A Three Piece Suite)" – 10:32
"Why I Went Missing" – 4:46
"How She Threw It All Away" – 4:17
"Iwasadoledadstoyboy" – 4:27
"Confessions 1, 2 & 3" – 4:43
"Confessions Of A Pop Group" – 9:27
"In Love for the First Time" – 3:39
"I Do Like to Be B-Side the A-Side" – 4:47

Disc five
"Promised Land" – 7:05
"Can You Still Love Me?" (Vocal Version) – 4:20
"Long Hot Summer '89" (TOM Mix Full Extended Version) – 5:29
"Everybody's on the Run" (early version) – 7:58
"A New Decade" – 3:24
"Can You Still Love Me?" (Extended Version) – 5:01
"The World Must Come Together" – 5:23
"Hope (Feelings Gonna Getcha)" – 7:16
"That Spiritual Feeling" – 7:35
"Everybody's on the Run" (later version) – 5:42
"Love of the World" – 8:56
"Sure Is Sure" – 6:18

References

The Style Council albums
1998 compilation albums
Polydor Records compilation albums